Dajana Butulija (born 23 February 1986) is a Serbian former professional women's basketball player. She represents the Serbian national basketball team.

International career
She represented Serbian national basketball team at the EuroBasket 2015 in Budapest where they won the gold medal, and qualified for the 2016 Olympics, first in the history for the Serbian team.

References

External links

Dajana Butulija at eurobasket.com
Dajana Butulija at fiba.com
Dajana Butulija at fibaeurope.com

1986 births
Living people
Sportspeople from Kikinda
Serbian women's basketball players
Shooting guards
ŽKK Partizan players
ŽKK Vršac players
ŽKK Radivoj Korać players
European champions for Serbia
Basketball players at the 2016 Summer Olympics
Olympic basketball players of Serbia
Olympic bronze medalists for Serbia
Medalists at the 2016 Summer Olympics
Olympic medalists in basketball
Serbian expatriate basketball people in Sweden
Serbian expatriate basketball people in Spain
Serbian expatriate basketball people in France
Serbian expatriate basketball people in Romania
Serbian expatriate basketball people in Poland
Basketball players at the 2020 Summer Olympics